Pycnarmon albivittalis is a moth in the family Crambidae. It was described by George Hampson in 1912. It is found in South Africa.

References

Endemic moths of South Africa
Spilomelinae
Moths described in 1912
Moths of Africa